Daniel, Dan or Danny Wallace may refer to:

 Daniel Wallace (politician) (1801–1859), U.S. Congressman from South Carolina
 Daniel B. Wallace (born 1952), professor of New Testament Studies at Dallas Theological Seminary
 Daniel Wallace (author) (born 1959), American author of the novel Big Fish
 Daniel J. Wallace (born 1949), American rheumatologist, professor and author
 Danny Wallace (footballer) (born 1964), English former international footballer
 Danny Wallace (humorist) (born 1976), author of Join Me and Yes Man, and television presenter
 Dan Wallace (politician) (born 1942), Irish politician
 Dan Wallace (swimmer) (born 1993), Scottish swimmer
 Daniel Wallace, the plaintiff in Wallace v. International Business Machines Corp. et al., a 2006 lawsuit filed against the GNU General Public License